Petrona Carrizo de Gandulfo (June 29, 1896 – February 6, 1992), better known as Doña Petrona, was an Argentine best-selling cookbook writer, home economist, television chef and businesswoman who was famous for "her elaborate dishes, provincial accent, matronly figure, didactic tone, and bossy treatment of her assistant [Juana Bordoy], as well as her responsiveness to fans". Although recognized as "the most famous Argentine cook", she was quoted as saying in 1985: "I never wanted to be anything other than a [home economist]. No one, except my friends, can say that they had Doña Petrona in their kitchen at any time."

Her cookbook El libro de Doña Petrona (Spanish for "Doña Petrona's book") was first released in 1933 and continues to be published, with over one hundred editions. It has been translated into eight languages. Argentine journalists have called it "the best-selling book in Latin America". In addition to being a commercial and editorial success, the book is a cult object and old editions are highly valued by collectors. Doña Petrona built a multimedia empire around her own name and used it to establish herself as the most popular and commercially supported celebrity chef in 20th-century Argentina. 

Over her seven-decade-long career, Doña Petrona was a highly influential figure for Argentine housewives. She had a lasting impact in Argentine cuisine and is regarded as a cultural icon. Her figure has been compared to that of Isabella Beeton in the United Kingdom, as her "popularity stemmed from her ability to tap into the desire for 'expert' domestic advice among the emerging middle classes". Her closest counterparts can be found not in other Latin American nations but rather in the United States, having points in common with Fannie Farmer, Betty Crocker, Irma Rombauer and Julia Child. However, due in part to Argentina's more concentrated media market, Doña Petrona's success "compares to not one, but all the major legends of home cooking in the United States put together."

See also
List of chefs
South American cuisine

Notes

References

External links
 
 

Argentine television chefs
Argentine food writers
Cookbook writers
People from La Banda
Argentine people of Spanish descent
Argentine people of indigenous peoples descent
1896 births
1992 deaths